The Heart of New England Council is a Boy Scouts of America council serving Cub Scout packs, Scouts BSA troops, Exploring posts and Venturing crews in central Massachusetts with administrative support, program resources, activities, events, and camping properties.

History 
The Heart of New England Council was formed in 2018 from the merge of Nashua Valley Council and Mohegan Council.

Mohegan Council served the greater Worcester area and southern Worcester County. Nashua Valley Council was formed in 1965 from the merge of Wachusett Council and Fitchburg Area Council. On May 30, 2018, the Nashua Valley Council annual meeting approved a proposal to merge. The Mohegan Council annual meeting approved their proposal to merge on May 31, 2018.

Organization 

The council is divided into the following districts, currently serving over 200 Scouting units:
 Quinapoxet District, serving the following communities (Acton, Ashby, Auburn, Ayer, Berlin, Bolton, Boylston, Boxborough, Clinton, Fitchburg, Groton, Harvard, Holden, Lancaster, Leicester, Leominster, Littleton, Lunenburg, Paxton, Pepperell, Princeton, Rutland, Shirley, Shrewsbury, Sterling, Townsend, West Boylston, and Worcester).
 Soaring Eagle District, serving the following communities (Ashburnham, Athol, Barre, Brookfield, Charlton, Douglas, Dudley, East Brookfield, Gardner, Grafton, Hardwick, Hubbardston, Millbury, New Braintree, Northbridge, North Brookfield, Oakham, Orange, Oxford, Petersham, Phillipston, Royalston, Southbridge, Spencer, Sturbridge, Sutton, Templeton, Upton, Ware, Warren, Webster, West Brookfield, Westminster, and Winchendon).
 
The council maintains three camp properties. Camp Wanocksett, in Dublin, New Hampshire, operates a summer week-long Scout and Venturing residential camp and a Webelos Resident Camp. Camp Split Rock, in Ashburnham, is used as a weekend retreat camp for units to rent cabins and campsites. Treasure Valley Scout Reservation, in Rutland, Massachusetts, which operates a weeklong Scout Resident Camp, a Cub Scout Day Camp, and a Webelos Resident Camp. 
All three camps are available to all Scouting units for year-round camping and programs.

Treasure Valley Scout Reservation 

Treasure Valley Scout Reservation is located in Rutland, Paxton, Oakham, and Spencer, and is located in the center of the Heart of New England coverage area. The camp still operates Summer Camp programs, and weekend programs. Located on Browning Pond. Treasure Valley Scout Reservation was developed on an old farm.

Camp Wanocksett 

Camp Wanocksett is a  Boy Scouts of America camp located in Dublin, New Hampshire, and borders the Monadnock State Park. It is used by the Heart of New England Council, which is based in central Massachusetts. Summer camp and weekend programs take place at the camp, and units can rent campsites and cabins. Camp Wanocksett borders Thorndike Pond and Mount Monadnock, one of the most frequently climbed mountains in the world. The camp was started in 1924 on land that had previously been a farm. Its name is derived from a combination of three mountains in the area; Watatic, Monadnock, and Wachusett.

Catamount Lodge 

Catamount Lodge is an Order of the Arrow lodge serving central Massachusetts, in Heart of New England Council. The lodge is run by its executive board, including five elected positions including chief, vice chiefs, secretary, and treasurer. The board is also made of several appointed chairs, including publications, inductions, brotherhood, dance team, and ceremonies among others. The lodge manages and conducts several events throughout the course of a year, including a Spring Fellowship Weekend, Fall Fellowship Weekend, Winter Fellowship Weekend, and a Lodge Banquet. The lodge has over 500 members, 80% of which are active in events.

Catamount Lodge was formed in 2019 by the merger of the Grand Monadnock Lodge and Pachachaug Lodge.

See also 
 Scouting in Massachusetts

References 

Local councils of the Boy Scouts of America
Northeast Region (Boy Scouts of America)
Youth organizations based in Massachusetts
2018 establishments in Massachusetts